Larry or Lawrence Newman may refer to:

 Larry Newman (rugby union) (1902–1963), rugby union player who represented Australia
 Larry Newman (aviator) (1947–2010), American pilot and balloonist
 Lawrence R. Newman (1925–2011), deaf activist and educator